The Abu Dhabi Open is a WTA 500-level professional women's tennis tournament. It takes place on outdoor hardcourts, and was introduced in 2021 to be played in the month of January at the Zayed Sports City International Tennis Centre in the city of Abu Dhabi, United Arab Emirates. The tournament was introduced due to the suspension of all WTA tournaments in China and delay of tournaments in Australia because of COVID-19 pandemic. In 2023, the event was brought back to the tour as a replacement for St. Petersburg Ladies' Trophy due to the suspension of WTA events in Russia because of their invasion of Ukraine. Another reason to host the tournament in Abu Dhabi was the strengthening of the Gulf season with the already established Dubai Tennis Championships and Qatar Total Open.

Results

Singles

Doubles

See also
 Dubai Tennis Championships
 Al Habtoor Tennis Challenge
 World Tennis Championship

References

External links
Official website

Sport in the United Arab Emirates
Hard court tennis tournaments
WTA Tour
Annual events in the United Arab Emirates
2021 establishments in the United Arab Emirates